Merbes-Sainte-Marie is a village of Wallonia and a district of the municipality of Merbes-le-Château, located in the province of Hainaut, Belgium.

Former municipalities of Hainaut (province)